Proline-rich basic protein 1 (PROB1) is a protein encoded by the PROB1 gene located on human chromosome 5, open reading frame 65. PROB1 is also known as C5orf65 and weakly similar to basic proline-rich protein.

Gene

Characteristics 
The PROB1 gene is 3251 bp long and contains a single exon.

Location 
The PROB1 gene is located on human chromosome 5, cytogenetic band 5q31.2.

mRNA

Expression 
PROB1 is expressed in 89 types of tissue in the human body, with highest expression in the skeletal muscle of the leg and cardiac muscle of the heart. While mRNA expression is somewhat ubiquitous and was also elevated in the spinal cord, cerebrum, and lymphocytes, measurable protein expression was only recorded in cardiac and skeletal muscle.

Protein
PROB1 is composed of 1015 amino acids. It contains two proline-rich regions, which compose the majority of the protein, and a domain of unknown function (DUF).

Structure 

Predicted secondary structures for PROB1 reveal that the protein is mostly composed of random coils, with a small percentage of alpha helices and beta sheets present. This is likely due to the properties of proline; its large size, ring structure, and confined phi angle cause it to disrupt secondary structure formation. The DUF, which resides in the second proline-rich region of the protein, is also predicted to be completely composed of random coils. A tertiary structure prediction for PROB1 was generated using I-Tasser and rendered in PyMOL; overall, the protein displays an elongated structure.

Sub-cellular Localization 
Analysis of protein structure, post-translational modifications, and localization signals reveals that PROB1 has no transmembrane domains and is an intracellular protein. Immunohistochemistry indicates its localization to the nucleoplasm of the cell.

Post-translational Modifications 
An array of post-translational modifications were found for PROB1, including an S-palmitolyation site and a multitude of overlapping O-GlcNAcylation and phosphorylation sites. A representation containing a subset of the predicted modifications was generated using Dog 2.0 and is shown below.

Interactions 
PROB1 has been found to be coexpressed with proteins SPATA24 and JADE2, but no notable functional protein interactions with PROB1 are known at this time.

Homology

Paralogs 
There are no known human paralogs of PROB1 to date.

Orthologs 
PROB1 has only mammalian orthologs. Its most distant ortholog is the marsupial Vombatus ursinus (common wombat), which is estimated to have diverged about 159 million years ago as dated by TimeTree. A subset of the multitude of orthologs produced by BLAST is shown in the accompanying table.

Clinical Significance 
PROB1 is implicated in keratoconus, which causes collagen-related degeneration of the cornea. Variants of PROB1 in the 5q31.1-q35.3 linkage region completely segregated with the keratoconus phenotype in a study utilizing segregation analysis methodology. Additionally, PROB1 expression is shown to be significantly elevated in several disease states, including head and neck cancer and prostate inflammation.

References 

Disorders of sclera and cornea
Evolutionary biology
Proteins